Swanee River may refer to:

 Old Folks at Home, an 1851 song often known unofficially as "Swanee River",  written by Stephen Foster
 Swanee River (1931 film), an American film
 Swanee River (1939 film), a film biography of Stephen Foster
 Swanee River (band)

See also 
 Suwannee River, the actual river in Florida which inspired the song
 Swanee (disambiguation)